The Museo Nazionale del Palazzo di Venezia is a state museum in Rome (Italy), housed in the palace of the same name together with the important Library of Archaeology and Art History.

Collections 
The Museum preserves paintings by artists such as Fra Angelico, Giorgione (Double portrait, about 1502), Giotto, Benozzo Gozzoli, Guercino, Carlo Maratta, Pisanello (Head of a woman), Guido Reni, Giorgio Vasari, Alessandro Algardi, Gian Lorenzo Bernini, as well as pastels, sculptures, bronzes, majolica, terracotta, western and oriental porcelain, medals, seals, furniture, weapons, ivories, silver, glass, enamels, fabrics and tapestries. It also preserves approximately 3,000 works from the Wurts Collection, which was formed by George Washington Wurts and Henrietta Tower and bequeathed to the Italian state on her death in 1933.
The external loggia (Garden of Paul II) houses a lapidarium.
The museum also hosts temporary exhibitions.

Image gallery

Transports 
  Metro stop (Colosseo, line B)

External links 

 Official museum website

Notes 

Museums in Rome
Art museums and galleries in Rome
National museums of Italy
1921 establishments in Italy